Elaine Gomes Barbosa (born 1 June 1992) is a Brazilian female handball player who plays for Romanian club Corona Brașov and the Brazil national team.

International honours 
World Championship:
Winner: 2013 
Pan American Games:
Winner: 2015, 2019 
South American Championship:
Winner: 2018

External links
Elaine Gomes Barbosa profile at the official European Handball Federation website

  

1992 births
Living people
Brazilian female handball players
Pan American Games gold medalists for Brazil
Brazilian expatriate sportspeople in Denmark
Brazilian expatriate sportspeople in Romania
Brazilian expatriate sportspeople in Turkey
Brazilian expatriate sportspeople in France
Expatriate handball players
Pan American Games medalists in handball
Handball players at the 2015 Pan American Games
Handball players at the 2019 Pan American Games
SCM Râmnicu Vâlcea (handball) players
Medalists at the 2015 Pan American Games
Medalists at the 2019 Pan American Games
Sportspeople from Fortaleza
20th-century Brazilian women
21st-century Brazilian women